Eflatun Pınar is the name given to a spring, which rises up from the ground, and the stone-built pool monument built at the time of the Hittite Empire. During the Late Bronze Age, a sacred pool monument was built here in trachyte ashlar masonry dedicated to the sacred spring cult of ancient Hittites. The monument was interpreted as a shrine to Plato during the medieval (Seljuk) period.

Overview
Eflatun Pınar's location near the lake shore corresponds to an almost exact level with other important ruins on the opposite shore, those of Kubadabad Palace, which were built by Seljuks.

Eflatun Pınar was briefly examined by the University of Oxford archaeologist Dr. Lucia Nixon in her paper on Çatalhöyük, and she makes use of F.W.Hasluck's early-20th century work. The site remains largely unexplored to date.

According to ArchaeoNews, Eflatun Pınar "designates the most south-westerly point of the Hittite expansion. The uniqueness of this place is also demonstrated by the fact that this is one of the few discovered places where the Hittites presented human figures from the front."

Eflatun Pınar has been on the Tentative UNESCO World Heritage list since 2014. The spring produces cold and clear water.

The Turkish name means 'lilac coloured or violet spring', though its name actually means Plato's Spring, stemming from the association between Plato and Konya since Selcuk times. The monument shows "a hierarchical image of the Hittite Pantheon represented on it", according to the UNESCO World Heritage site. The image depicts "five mountain gods with the characteristic skirts with scales forming the bottom row of the fully excavated main monument". Above these are seated a male and female "divine couple", probably representing the storm god and sun goddess, Tarhunna and Arinniti. The same figures are probably also represented on the Southern and Eastern walls.

Aside from these main images, "several sculptures of reclined animals were found in the filler of the basin, it concerned probably the execution of lions, deers and bulls. This rich supply of sculptures adds to already more long well known remainder of a twin animals group. Votive miniature ceramic vessels very similar to those found in Bogazkoy Hattusa ponds were also uncovered inside the basin together with one bronze pin."

According to Somewhere Wonderful, "The site has recently been ‘improved’ by Konya’s museum service; in a crass mix of the twee and the totalitarian its operatives have installed willow-pattern wooden bridges while a barbed-wire fence with concrete uprights keeps the cattle out."

References

External links

 Anthropology, Archaeology and Heritage in the Balkans and Anatolia
 Views of Eflatunpinar Hittite Spring Temple & Dam

Beyşehir District
Hittite sites in Turkey
Pisidia
World Heritage Tentative List for Turkey
Landforms of Konya Province
Hittite art
Holy springs of Turkey